The Lima Cigarmakers were a minor league baseball team based in Lima, Ohio. From 1908 to 1912, the Cigarmakers played as members of the Class D level Ohio State League, winning the 1909 league championship. The Cigarmakers hosted home minor league games at San Felice Park.

History
Lima first hosted minor league baseball in 1888, when the Lima "Lushers" played the season as members of independent Tri-State League. The Cigarmakers were preceded in minor league play by the 1906 Lima Lees of the Class C level Interstate Association.

In 1908, the Lima "Cigarmakers" began play as charter members of the six-team, Class D level Ohio State League.The Lancaster Lanks, Mansfield Pioneers, Marion Diggers, Newark Newks and Springfield Reapers teams joined Lima in beginning league play on April 23, 1908.

The "Cigarmakers" nickname corresponds with the cigarmaking industry in Lima in the era, which included the Deisel-Wemmer-Gilbert cigar factory. In addition, the team hosted home games at San Felice Park, with San Felice being a brand of cigars manufactured in the region in the era.

In their first season of play, the Cigarmakers placed second in the six–team Ohio State League. Lima ended the Ohio State League season with an overall regular season record of 80–67, managed by Jim Jackson and Nick Kahl. The Cigarmakers finished 11.0 games behind the place first place Lancaster Lanks in the final regular season standings, as the league held no playoffs. Lima pitcher Charles Pickett, led the league with a 21-7 record, while Frank Foutz led the league with 12 home runs and Duke Reilley had 80 stolen bases, tops in the league.

The Lima Cigarmakers were the 1909 Ohio State League champions. The Cigarmakers placed first in the standings with a 79–50 record, playing under manager Lee Fohl. Lima finished 8.5 games ahead of the second place Marion Diggers in the final standings. The Cigarmakers had numerous league leaders on their 1909 roster, as Charles Fink led the league with 91 runs scored and Duke Reilley led the league in stolen bases for the second consecutive season, stealing 76. Lima pitcher Robert Nelson won .800 of his games to lead the league.

The Cigarmakers continued play Ohio state League play in the 1910 season, as Lima finished second in the standings. With a record of 82-52, the Cigarmakers finished 4.0 games behind the first place Portsmouth Cobblers in the six-team league final standings. Al Newham served as the Lima manager.Frank Nesser of Lima was the league home run champion, hitting six, while pitcher Henry Lloyd led the league with a 10-3 record.

In 1911, the Lima Cigarmakers, played in an expanded Ohio State League, placing sixth in the eight-team league. Lima ended the season with 1 62-77 record playing the season under the direction of player/manager Frank Nesser. The Cigarmakers finished 22.0 games behind the first place Springfield Reapers in the final standings.

In their final season of play, the 1912 Lima Cigars continued play as the Ohio State League returned to a six–team league. playing under manager Zeke Wrigley, Lime ended the season With a record of 64–73. Lima finished 25.5 games behind the 1st place Portsmouth Cobblers. Frank Nesser of Lima led the league with 170 total hits.

Lima did not return to play in the 1913 Ohio State League, as the league expanded to eight teams and added four new franchises.

Lima, Ohio has next hosted a minor league team, when the 1915 Lima Boosters played the season as members of the Class D level Buckeye League. In 1939, the Lima Pandas rejoined the Ohio State League, where the franchise played another eleven seasons.

The ballpark
The Lima Cigarmakers hosted minor league home games at San Felice Park. San Felice Park corresponds with "San Felice" being a brand of cigars manufactured in the region in the era, produced in the Diesel-Wemmer cigar company located in Lima. The ballpark was located on West Grand Avenue, near North McDonel Street.

Timeline

Year-by-year records

Notable alumni

Harry Daubert (1912)
Ed Donalds (1911)
Lee Fohl (1909, MGR)
Frank Foutz (1908-1909)
Lefty Houtz (1910-1911)
Jim Jackson (1908, MGR)
Pete Johns (1909)
Nick Kahl (1908, MGR)
George Kahler (1909)
Fred Link (1908)
Ray Miller (1909)
Frank Nesser (1910; 1911, MGR; 1912)
Jiggs Parson (1908)
Charlie Pickett (1908-1909)
Duke Reilley (1908-1909)
George Textor (1910)
Zeke Wrigley (1912, MGR)

See also
Lima Cigarmakers players

References

External links
Baseball Reference

Defunct minor league baseball teams
Professional baseball teams in Ohio
Defunct baseball teams in Ohio
Baseball teams established in 1908
Baseball teams disestablished in 1912
Ohio State League teams
Lima, Ohio